Muzamil Imran oghlu Abdullayev (1941 – 17 June 2022) was an Azerbaijani winemaker and politician.

He served as the Minister of Food and Agriculture from 1993 to 1994.

Abdullayev died on 17 June 2022.

References

1941 births
2022 deaths
Azerbaijani politicians
Azerbaijani businesspeople
Communist Party of the Soviet Union members
Azerbaijan State Agricultural University alumni
Politicians from Ganja, Azerbaijan